Robert Lacey (born 3 January 1944) is a British historian and biographer. He is the author of a number of best-selling biographies, including those of Henry Ford, Eileen Ford, Queen Elizabeth II and other royals, as well as several other works of popular history. He is best known for his work as historian to the Netflix award-winning drama The Crown. Lacey was educated at Selwyn College, Cambridge, where he studied history.

Early life

Robert grew up in Bristol and won a scholarship to Bristol Grammar School.

Lacey is an alumnus of Selwyn College, Cambridge, where he earned a BA in History in 1967, a diploma of education in 1967, and an MA in 1970. He began his writing career as a journalist on the Illustrated London News, and later The Sunday Times.

Career

Lacey's 1981 work The Kingdom, about the Saudi royal family, and its 2009 follow-up Inside the Kingdom have now both been cited as standard study texts for the diplomatic community working inside the Kingdom of Saudi Arabia. David Brancaccio said: "In Saudi Arabia, Robert Lacey had the kind of access most journalists only dream of."

To research and write the book Lacey took his wife and children to live for two and a half years in Jeddah in the late 1970s. Friends he made there included journalist Jamal Khashoggi. Lacey co-wrote his last three articles before Khashoggi was murdered in 2018.

In 2009 Lacey made the controversial documentary Rehab for Terrorists?: Can Terrorists be Rehabilitated with Kindness? for the Now show for the PBS channel and appeared as  a commentator on the subject for the channel. Lacey is  a royal correspondent,  appearing regularly on  ABC's Good Morning America and was in London for the channel covering the wedding of Prince William and Catherine Middleton.  Lacey  remains active in academia, giving lectures "around the world".

Lacey is the historical consultant to the Netflix series The Crown. The series has been widely criticised in the UK - despite its commercial success - for its historical inaccuracies and artistic inventions; former National Trust chairman and ex-Times editor Simon Jenkins branded it "cowardly...fake history".

Robert Lacey is trustee to Kent Opera, which provides training and development of professional and amateur opera singers and educational and community workshops linked to operas. 

During a live BBC broadcast covering the arrival of the coffin of the late Queen Elizabeth II in Edinburgh Lacey spoke of his admiration for John Knox whom he erroneously claimed had "cleared the Catholics out of Scotland." Lacey's comments attracted almost 300 complaints and were reported in the national press.

Family
His first marriage to Alexandra Jane "Sandi" Avrach ended in 2004 in a legal separation after 34 years. They had three children: Sasha, Scarlett and Bruno.

In August 2012, Lacey married Lady Jane Rayne (b. 11 August 1932), the daughter of The 8th Marquess of Londonderry and widow of property developer Max Rayne. Lady Jane Rayne Lacey is  a founding member and director of the Chickenshed Theatre and was President of Trustees until her daughter Natasha took over in 2013.

Works 

 Robert, Earl of Essex: An Elizabethan Icarus (1971)
 The Life and Times of Henry VIII (1972)
 The Queens of the North Atlantic (1973)
 Sir Walter Ralegh (1973)
 Majesty (1977)
 The Kingdom (1981), History of Saudi Arabia to 1979.
 Princess (1982) with Michael Rand
 Aristocrats (1983)
 Ford (1986)
 God Bless Her! (1987)
 Little Man: Meyer Lansky and the Gangster Life (1991)
 Grace (1994)
 Sotheby's: Bidding for class (1998)
 The Queen Mother's Century (1999) with Michael Rand
 The Year 1000: What Life Was Like at the Turn of the First Millennium (1999, with Danny Danziger)
 Royal (2002)
 Monarch: Life and Reign of Elizabeth II  (2002)
 Great Tales from English History, Volume 1 (2003)
 Great Tales from English History, Volume 2 (2005)
 Great Tales from English History, Volume 3 (2006)
 Inside the Kingdom (2009), History of Saudi Arabia from 1979 to date.
 A Brief Life of the Queen (2012)
 Gulf Charities and Islamic Philanthropy in the Age of Terror and Beyond (2014) with Jonathan Benthall)
 Model Woman: Eileen Ford and the Business of Beauty (2015)
 The Crown: The official book of the hit Netflix series (2017)
 The Crown Volume 2: The official book of the hit Netflix series (2019)
 Battle of Brothers: William, Harry and the Inside Story of a Family in Tumult (2020)
 Battle of Brothers: William, Harry and the Inside Story of a Family in Tumult - Fully Revised and Updated (2021)

References

External links 
 Robert Lacey website
 Inside the Kingdom – The Official Website for Robert Lacey's Book
 Transcript: Rehab for Terrorists?
 

English historians
English biographers
People educated at Bristol Grammar School
Living people
1944 births
Alumni of Selwyn College, Cambridge